This is a list of airports in Tennessee (a U.S. state), grouped by type and sorted by location. It contains all public-use and military airports in the state. Some private-use and former airports may be included where notable, such as airports that were previously public-use, those with commercial enplanements recorded by the FAA or airports assigned an IATA airport code.

Airports

See also 
 Essential Air Service
 Tennessee World War II Army Airfields
 Wikipedia:WikiProject Aviation/Airline destination lists: North America#Tennessee

References 

Federal Aviation Administration (FAA):
 FAA Airport Data (Form 5010) from National Flight Data Center (NFDC), also available from AirportIQ 5010
 National Plan of Integrated Airport Systems (2017-2021), released September 2016
 Passenger Boarding (Enplanement) Data for CY 2016 (final), released October 2017

Tennessee Department of Transportation (TDOT):
 Aeronautics Division
 Airport Directory

Other sites used as a reference when compiling and updating this list:
 Aviation Safety Network – used to check IATA airport codes
 Great Circle Mapper: Airports in Tennessee – used to check IATA and ICAO airport codes
 Abandoned & Little-Known Airfields: Tennessee – used for information on former airports

 
Airports
Tennessee
Airports